Amadou Dia N'Diaye (born 2 January 2000) is a Senegalese professional footballer who plays as a forward for Swiss club Xamax and the Senegal national team.

Club career
On 1 February 2023, N'Diaye signed with Xamax in Switzerland.

Career statistics

International goals
Scores and results list Senegal's goal tally first, score column indicates score after each Dia N'Diaye goal.

Honours 
Senegal U20
 Africa U-20 Cup of Nations runner-up: 2019

References

External links

2000 births
People from Diourbel Region
Living people
Senegalese footballers
Senegal youth international footballers
Senegal international footballers
Association football forwards
Génération Foot players
FC Metz players
FC Sochaux-Montbéliard players
R.F.C. Seraing (1922) players
Le Mans FC players
Neuchâtel Xamax FCS players
Ligue 2 players
Championnat National players
Championnat National 2 players
Championnat National 3 players
Challenger Pro League players
Senegalese expatriate footballers
Expatriate footballers in France
Senegalese expatriate sportspeople in France
Expatriate footballers in Belgium
Senegalese expatriate sportspeople in Belgium
Expatriate footballers in Switzerland
Senegalese expatriate sportspeople in Switzerland